The Transnet Freight Rail Class 45-000 of 2015 is a South African diesel-electric locomotive.

Manufacturers

The acquisition of the Class 45-000 forms part of the largest-ever locomotive supply contract in South African history and the single-biggest investment initiative by a South African corporation. It consists of contracts for the construction of 1,064 locomotives by four global original equipment manufacturers:
 General Electric South Africa Technologies (a unit of the U.S.-based GE Transportation) for 233 Class 44-000 diesel-electric locomotives.
 CNR Rolling Stock South Africa (Pty.) Ltd. for 232 Class 45-000 diesel-electric locomotives.
 CSR Zhuzhou Electric Locomotive Company for 359 Class 22E dual-voltage electric locomotives.
 Bombardier Transportation South Africa for 240 Class 23E dual-voltage electric locomotives.

Illustration
All the Class 45-000 locomotives were delivered in red TFR livery.

References

3540
Co-Co locomotives
General Electric locomotives
Transnet Rail Engineering locomotives
Cape gauge railway locomotives
Railway locomotives introduced in 2015
2015 in South Africa